Draijer is a surname. Notable people with the surname include:

Dave Draijer (born 1973), Dutch baseball player
Wiebe Draijer (born 1965), Dutch engineer, civil servant, and management consultant

See also
Johannes Draaijer (1963–1990), Dutch cyclist